"Almost Always" is a popular song, written by Lew Douglas, Frank Lavere and Kathleen Lichty. 
It was recorded by Joni James in 1953. The recording was released by MGM as catalog number 11470. The song was only on the Billboard magazine charts for one week,  reaching #18 on May 9, 1953. The flip side was "Is It Any Wonder?"

References

1953 singles
American pop songs
MGM Records singles
Songs written by Lew Douglas